The Brentwood Borough School District is a small, suburban public school district. It serves the Borough of Brentwood in Allegheny County, Pennsylvania.  The School District of the Borough of Brentwood encompasses approximately 1.5 square miles. According to 2000 federal census data, it serves a resident population of 10,466. In 2009, the district residents' per capita income was $20,024, while the median family income was $48,552.

The district operates three schools:
Brentwood Middle/High School,
Elroy Avenue Elementary School (K-5th)
Moore Elementary School (K-5th)

Extracurriculars
The district offers a wide variety of clubs, activities and sports.

Sports
The district offers high school students: Track and Field, Golf, Football, Girls' Volleyball, Girls' Basketball, Girls' Softball, Baseball, Cross Country, Soccer, and Swimming.

Middle school - Swimming, Cheerleading, Basketball, as well as Track and Field.

It also offers a combined Middle and High school marching band

References

School districts in Allegheny County, Pennsylvania
Education in Pittsburgh area